Mid-Orange Correctional Facility was an all-male, medium security prison located in the town of Warwick, New York. It closed in 2011.

This facility was involved in a controversial case in which a correctional officer, Christopher Nuttall, started taking in cats left astray in the area. In collaboration with inmates, he cared for the cats and fed them. He was suspended and later fired on charges of "contraband and collaboration with inmates". Two months later, he was hired again, with the assistance of Council 82 (statewide correction officers union).

The prison was also the site of a strike by state prison employees in 1979. National Guardsmen were sent to the prison as strikebreakers, and were quartered in employee housing. This resulted in the only known caselaw for the Third Amendment, the US 2nd Circuit Court of Appeals case Engblom v. Carey.

The facility was targeted for closure in 2011 as part of Governor Andrew Cuomo's prison closing program. As of 2022, the area surrounding the prison has been converted to Wickham Woodlands, a town park, and is also being developed for corporate and light industrial use as the Warwick Valley Office & Technology Corporate Park.

Notable prisoners
Gerald Garson, former New York Supreme Court Justice, convicted of accepting bribes

External links  
  NY prison information

References

Prisons in New York (state)
Economy of Orange County, New York
2011 disestablishments in New York (state)